Kansas City City Hall is the official seat of government for the city of Kansas City, Missouri. Located in downtown, it is a 29-story skyscraper with an observation deck. Completed in 1937, the building has a Beaux-Arts and Art-Deco style with numerous architectural features and ornamentation throughout. One Kansas City Place was modeled as a 1980s version of City Hall, and is the tallest building in Kansas City.

History
Situated on a city block bounded by E. 11th Street, E. 12th Street, Oak Street, and Locust Street, this 29-story structure was designed by Wight and Wight in the Neo-Classic and Beaux-Arts architectural style and built to replace and expand an earlier city hall. It is the third city hall since the incorporation of the City of Kansas in 1853. Construction of the building lasted for 22 months and the concrete was supplied by then-political boss Tom Pendergast. Its location has served as the center of city government since 1937. When it was completed, it was the tallest building in the city. It is currently the third-tallest building in the city and one of the tallest city halls in the United States. The exterior features Indiana limestone. An underground parking garage extends under the south lawn. Several types of marble enhance the building’s interior design, including Pyrenees marble from southwestern France, travertine marble from Tivoli, Italy, and Verde antique marble from Vermont. Some of the woods are oak and walnut. The total cost of construction was approximately $6 million, which far exceeds the $4 million bond monies allotted for the project.

Features

Interior
The building has Art-Deco details and ornamentation. This is particularly evident within the building. The entrance interior has elaborate marble stairways and bronze architectural features honoring the history of Kansas City. Myriad interior details include sculpted brass elevator doors depicting the four major modes of transportation that serve Kansas City, elaborate light fixtures in the lobby and elsewhere, and custom brass doorknob plates.

Exterior

At the top of the six story base on the exterior of the building, windows are replaced with a frieze of relief sculptures depicting the early settlement and growth of the Kansas City area. Sculptures on the exterior of the building include those by C. Paul Jennewein, Ulric Ellerhusen, and Walker Hancock. Images in the panels of the building include Senator Thomas Hart Benton, Benoist Troost, Kersey Coates, Lewis and Clark, the Chouteau trading post, and the Santa Fe Trail.

To the south of the building are fountains with two ornamental sea horses, dolphins, and seashells. City employees named the sea horses "Lug" (on the west side) and "Cut" (on the east side) soon after the fountain's dedication. They were named for lugs of the political machine and cuts in pay for city workers in the 1930s. A statue of Abraham Lincoln and his son Tad was sculpted by Lorenzo Ghiglieri.

The top floor features an observation deck.

See also

 List of tallest buildings in Kansas City, Missouri

References

1937 establishments in Missouri
Art Deco architecture in Missouri
City halls in Missouri
Downtown Kansas City
Government buildings completed in 1937
Government of Kansas City, Missouri
Skyscraper office buildings in Kansas City, Missouri